Ngāti Pōneke Young Māori Club is an Urban Māori cultural club that was formed in Wellington, New Zealand, in 1937. It is a pan-tribal group of Māori who reside in Wellington (like Ngāti Ākarana in Auckland and Ngāti Rānana in London). "" is a Māori language name for Wellington, derived from "Port Nicholson".

References

Further reading 

 Broughton, A., & Grace, P. (2001). The silent migration : Ngāti Pōneke Young Māori Club 1937-1948 : Stories of urban migration. Wellington, N.Z.: Huia.
 Ngāti Pōneke Young Māori Club, I. (1966). Grand concert : Ngāti Pōneke Young Māori Club celebrates its 30th anniversary, in the presence of the Prime Minister The Right Honourable Keith Holyoake, C.H., and Mrs Holyoake, St. James Theatre, Sunday, 30th October, 1966.

Urban Māori
Wellington City